Rumia Lake is a small artificial lake within the Metropolitan City of Reggio Calabria.

The lake is a well-known hiking and fishing destination, where species like the brown trout, rainbow trout, common carp, and mirror carp can be found in the lake.

Lakes of Calabria